Unearthed is a box set by American country singer Johnny Cash. It was released by American Recordings on November 25, 2003, two months after Cash's death. The album was compiled by Cash and Rick Rubin, who also produced the set. It was certified Gold on December 2, 2004, by the Recording Industry Association of America.

Content
The first three discs feature outtakes and alternate versions of songs recorded for American Recordings, American II: Unchained, American III: Solitary Man and American IV: The Man Comes Around. The fourth disc, My Mother's Hymn Book features gospel songs Cash first learned from his mother as a child and was later reissued as a standalone album in 2004. The final disc is a best-of distillation of the first four American albums.

Previous recordings
Many of the songs Cash recorded during the American sessions were updated versions of songs he had previously recorded.
"Long Black Veil" was previously recorded by Cash for his 1965 album Orange Blossom Special.
"Flesh and Blood" was previously recorded by Cash for the soundtrack to the 1970 film I Walk the Line.
"Understand Your Man" was previously recorded by Cash for his 1964 album I Walk the Line.
"Banks of the Ohio" was previously recorded by Cash with the Carter Family for the 1964 album Keep on the Sunny Side.
"The Caretaker" was previously recorded by Cash for his 1959 album Songs of Our Soil.
"Old Chunk of Coal" was previously recorded by Cash for his 1979 album A Believer Sings the Truth.
"I'm Going to Memphis" was previously recorded by Cash for his 1960 album Ride This Train.
"Waiting for the Train" was previously recorded by Cash for his 1963 album Blood, Sweat & Tears.
"No Earthly Good' was previously recorded by Cash for his 1976 album The Rambler.
"The Fourth Man in the Fire" was previously recorded by Cash for his 1969 album The Holy Land.
"Dark as a Dungeon" was previously recorded by Cash as the B-side to his 1964 single "Understand Your Man".
"I'm Moving On" was previously recorded by Cash in 1984 as a duet with Waylon Jennings. This version would not be released until 2014 on Out Among the Stars.
"As Long as the Grass Shall Grow" was previously recorded by Cash for his 1964 album Bitter Tears: Ballads of the American Indian.
"Devil's Right Hand" was previously recorded by Cash with the Highwaymen for the 1995 album The Road Goes on Forever.
"The L & N Don't Stop Here Anymore" was previously recorded by Cash for his 1979 album Silver.
"Father and Son" was previously recorded by Cash as "Father and Daughter" for his 1974 album The Junkie and the Juicehead Minus Me.
"When the Roll Is Called Up Yonder" was previously recorded by Cash for his 1975 album Johnny Cash Sings Precious Memories.
"If We Never Meet Again This Side of Heaven" was previously recorded by Cash for his 1962 album Hymns from the Heart.
"Let the Lower Lights Be Burning" was previously recorded by Cash for his 1962 album Hymns from the Heart.
"When He Reached Down His Hand for Me" was previously recorded by Cash for his 1962 album Hymns from the Heart.
"In the Sweet By-and-By" was previously recorded by Cash for his 1975 album Sings Precious Memories.
"Softly and Tenderly" was previously recorded by Cash for his 1975 album Sings Precious Memories.
"Just as I Am" was previously recorded by Cash for his 1975 album Sings Precious Memories.

Critical reception
Rock historian Graeme Thomson in his monograph, The Resurrection of Johnny Cash: Hurt, Redemption, and American Recordings has called Unearthed a monolithic achievement.

Track listing

Note: All tracks previously unreleased. A different take of "Down There by the Train" was issued on the 1994 album American Recordings.

Note: All tracks previously unreleased. A solo version of "Like a Soldier", a version of "Drive On" featuring different lyrics, and an acoustic studio version of "Bird on a Wire" were issued on the 1994 album American Recordings.

Note: All tracks previously unreleased, except "Wichita Lineman" and "Big Iron" which were previously released on the original vinyl pressing of American IV: The Man Comes Around. The final version of "The Man Comes Around" was also released on American IV: The Man Comes Around.

Note: All tracks previously unreleased.

Note: All tracks previously released, although "Thirteen" features an additional verse that was omitted from its original album release.

Personnel
Adapted from the album liner notes.

 Johnny Cash – Vocals, Guitar, Arranger, Adaptation
 Glen Campbell – Vocals, Performer
 Fiona Apple – Vocals
 Nick Cave – Vocals
 Joe Strummer – Vocals
 John Carter Cash – Performer, Arranger, Engineer, Associate Producer, Adaptation
 David Ferguson – Performer, Engineer, Mixing
 D. Sardy – Performer, Engineer, Mixing
 Greg Fidelman – Performer, Mixing
 Bill Bateman – Performer
 Norman Blake – Performer
 Thom Bresh – Performer
 Nick Cave – Performer
 Lester Butler – Performer
 Mike Campbell – Performer
 Laura Cash – Performer
 Jack Clement – Performer
 Sheryl Crow – Performer
 Howie Epstein – Performer
 Steve Ferrone – Performer
 Flea – Performer
 John Frusciante – Performer
 Terry Harrington – Performer
 Smokey Hormel – Performer
 Rami Jaffee – Performer
 Roger Joseph Manning Jr. – Performer
 Carl Perkins – Performer
 Larry Perkins – Performer
 Tom Petty – Performer
 Juliet Prater – Performer
 David Roe – Performer
 Randy Scruggs – Performer
 Paul "The Kid" Size – Performer
 Chad Smith – Performer
 Marty Stuart – Performer
 Benmont Tench – Performer
 Jimmy Tittle – Performer
 Rick Rubin – Producer
 Richard Dodd, Thom Russo, Andrew Scheps, David Schiffman, Chuck Turner – Engineers
 Sylvia Massy – Engineer, Mixing
 Jim Scott – Mixing
 Vlado Meller – Mastering
 Steven Kadison – Assistant
 Christine Cano – Art Direction, Design, Photography
 Martyn Atkins, Andy Earl – Photography
 Lindsay Chase – Production Coordination
 Sylvie Simmons – Interviewer, Text

Charts
Album – Billboard (United States)

Certifications

My Mother's Hymn Book

My Mother's Hymn Book is a collection of Christian spiritual songs and hymns that Cash originally learned from his mother while growing up.  The album features only Cash's voice and a single acoustic guitar.  This disc was released as a stand-alone disc the following year (his 89th overall album) under the same title, and peaked at #9 on the Christian music album chart. In the album's liner notes Cash mentions that this is his favorite album he ever made.

This was Cash's final album devoted to previously unreleased performances of faith-based music and hymns, following a long string of such releases dating back to 1959 and individual singles and album tracks even before that. Tracks 6, 9 and 10 were previously recorded for Hymns from the Heart (1962); tracks 5, 11, 14 and 15 were previously recorded for Sings Precious Memories (1975); and track 7 was recorded in concert for The Survivors Live (1982). Several other songs, such as track 13, had been performed by Cash on TV or live in concert, but formal studio recordings had not yet been issued until now.

Although the images used on the standalone CD depict Cash near the end of his life, most of the recordings on My Mother's Hymn Book actually date to Cash's early sessions for American in 1993–1994 (hence the fact they only feature Cash performing by himself).

Track listing

Personnel
Adapted from the album liner notes.
Karen Adams – Group Member
Craig Allen – Design
Martyn Atkins – Photography
John Carter Cash – Liner Notes, Associate Producer
Rosanne Cash – Liner Notes
Lindsay Chase – Production Coordination
Steven Kadison – Assistant
Vlado Meller – Mastering
Rick Rubin – Producer

References

External links
 Luma Electronic's Johnny Cash discography listing

Albums produced by Rick Rubin
Unearthed (album)#Disc 4 – My Mother's Hymn Book
Compilation albums published posthumously
2003 compilation albums
Gothic country albums
Johnny Cash compilation albums
American Recordings (record label) albums
Universal Music Group compilation albums